Regional elections were held in Denmark on 5 March 1974.  4735 municipal council members were elected to the 1974–1978 term of office in the 275 municipalities, as well as 370 members of the 14 counties of Denmark. The term of office was 1 April 1974 to 31 March 1978. This followed the financial year in the public sector. From 1 January 1979 the financial year in the public sector became the same as the calendar year, 1 January to 31 December.

Results of regional elections
The results of the regional elections:

County Councils

Municipal Councils

References

1974
Denmark
March 1974 events in Europe